Eupithecia lupa is a moth in the family Geometridae. It is found in Taiwan.

The wingspan is about 18–19 mm.

References

Moths described in 2007
lupa
Moths of Taiwan